Jiří Novák (born 26 October 1969) is a retired Czech football striker.

A youth international for Czechoslovakia, Novák was a squad member at the 1989 FIFA World Youth Championship and the 1992 UEFA European Under-21 Championship.

References

1969 births
Living people
Czech footballers
SK Slavia Prague players
Dukla Prague footballers
Fortuna Düsseldorf players
FC Slovan Liberec players
FK Jablonec players
SK Dynamo České Budějovice players
Bohemians 1905 players
Czech First League players
Czech 2. Liga players
2. Bundesliga players
Czech expatriate footballers
Expatriate footballers in Germany
Czech expatriate sportspeople in Germany
Association football forwards
Czechoslovakia youth international footballers
Czechoslovakia under-21 international footballers